This is a list of members of the Australian Senate from 1929 to 1932. Half of its members were elected at the 14 November 1925 election and had terms starting on 1 July 1926 and finishing on 30 June 1932; the other half were elected at the 17 November 1928 election and had terms starting on 1 July 1929 and finishing on 30 June 1935. The process for filling casual vacancies was complex. While senators were elected for a six-year term, people appointed to a casual vacancy only held office until the earlier of the next election for the House of Representatives or the Senate.

The Government changed during the Senate term as the Coalition of the Nationalist Party  led by Prime Minister of Australia Stanley Bruce and the Country Party led by Earle Page lost the confidence of the House of Representatives and called an election for October 1929. The Labor Party, led by James Scullin, won the election with a large majority. This was the first time in which an election for the House of Representatives was held without an election for the Senate. Section 13 of the Constitution requires an election to occur within one year of the expiry of senate terms and the terms of senators elected in 1925 were not due to expire until 1932.

In 1931 five Labor members in the House of Representatives split from the Scullin government in opposition to its economic policies on the Great Depression and joined the Nationalist Party and three conservative independents in the House to form the United Australia Party (UAP). Subsequently, some New South Wales members and senators were expelled from the Labor Party for their support of New South Wales Premier Jack Lang's policy of repudiating foreign debt and formed the Australian Labor Party (New South Wales)—known as —and later voted with the UAP to defeat the Scullin government, leading to the 1931 election.

Notes

References

Members of Australian parliaments by term
20th-century Australian politicians
Australian Senate lists